The Sires' Produce Stakes is a South Australian Jockey Club Group 3 Thoroughbred horse race for horses aged two years old, at set weights, over a distance of 1400 metres at Morphettville Racecourse, Adelaide, Australia. Total prizemoney is $127,250.

History

The inaugural race was won by the filly Norwich, who won her sixth two-year-old race in 1945 in this race at the starting odds of 1/6on.

Distance
1945–1959 - 1 mile (~1600 metres)
1960–1965 - 7 furlongs (~1400 metres)
1966–1972 - 1 mile (~1600 metres)
1973–2009 – 1600 metres
2010 onwards - 1400 metres (held on the inner track at Morphettville)

Grade
1945–1978 - Principal Race
1979–1991 - Group 2
1992 onwards - Group 3

Winners

 2022 - Twin Stars 
 2021 - Biscayne Bay 
2020 - Ringbolt 
2019 - She Shao Fly 
2018 - Tequila Time   
2017 - Time Awaits   
2016 - Flying Jess    
2015 - The Grey Flash
 2014 - Go Indy Go
 2013 - The Voice
 2012 - Molto Bene
 2011 - Cute Emily
 2010 - Stirling Grove
 2009 - Silent Surround
 2008 - Rebel Raider
 2007 - Bantry Bay
 2006 - Anamato
 2005 - Isanami
 2004 - Calorific
 2003 - Under The Bridge
 2002 - Lashed
 2001 - Li Lo Lill
 2000 - Ez
 1999 - Smytzer's Rivalry
 1998 - Clay Fighter
 1997 - Umrum
 1996 - Litmus
 1995 - Niarchos
 1994 - Zoffoff
 1993 - Trivia Lass
 1992 - Kingston Spirit
 1991 - Charleston Party
 1990 - Abandoned War
 1989 - Interstellar
 1988 - Almurtajaz
 1987 - Cindy's Appeal
 1986 - El Vaquero
 1985 - Tristabelle
 1984 - Unique Dancer
 1983 - Taminor
 1982 - Aree Lad
 1981 - Top Of The Ladder
 1980 - Who Can Say
 1979 - Tell Fibs
 1978 - Count Babylon
 1977 - Kiwi Princess
 1976 - Sir Sahib
 1975 - Rondelay
 1974 - Zasu
 1973 - Bush Win
 1972 - Roman Interlude
 1971 - Odysseus
 1970 - Eleazar
 1969 - Cobbermine
 1968 - Always There
 1967 - Vitalis
 1966 - Farmer's Daughter
 1965 - Far Hills
 1964 - Yangtze
 1963 - Sunny Coronation
 1962 - Proud Miss
 1961 - Makmore
 1960 - Beau Sabreur
 1959 - Royal Artist
 1958 - Jordan
 1957 - Cherete
 1956 - Newstone
 1955 - Wine Lover
 1954 - Fair Moon
 1953 - Introibo
 1952 - Cellar Master
 1951 - Beau Cavalier
 1950 - Miss Damper
 1949 - Regal Gem
 1948 - Parlez Vous
 1947 - Comedy Prince
 1946 - Conservator
 1945 - Norwich

See also
 List of Australian Group races
 Group races

References

Horse races in Australia
Sport in Adelaide